Epapterus blohmi is a species of driftwood catfish distributed in the Orinoco River basin and Tuy River of the Caribbean coast of Venezuela. E. blohmi grows to  SL. It is found in a variety of habitats where there is poor visibility and the water is still or slow-flowing. It feeds on filamentous algae and other plant material during the dry season.

References 

Auchenipteridae
Fish described in 1984
Fish of Venezuela